The Yugoslavia Cross Country Championships ( / ) was an annual cross country running competition that served as Yugoslavia's national championship for the sport. The main races on the programme were a men's and a women's long course race. Short course races for men were held until 1966.

The most successful athlete at the competition was Olivera Jevtić, who took seven straight women's title from 1994 to 2000. Dragoslav Prpa was the most successful male athlete at the competition, having four titles to his name including three consecutive wins from 1996 to 1998.

Senior race winners

Short race

References

List of winners
Yugoslav Championships. GBR Athletics. Retrieved 2018-02-25.
Prvenstva Jugoslavije u Atletici by Ljubisa Gajić

Athletics competitions in Yugoslavia
National cross country running competitions
Annual sporting events in Yugoslavia
Cross country running in Yugoslavia
Defunct athletics competitions
Cross Country